Hwaseong, formerly named Namyang (남양 / 南陽)
 Namyang clan, of the Hong family of Korea
 Namyang Workers' District (남양로동자구 / 南陽勞動者區)